Raymond Keeley (born 25 December 1946) is an English former professional footballer who played in the Football League for Charlton Athletic, Exeter City and Mansfield Town.

References

1946 births
Living people
English footballers
Association football forwards
English Football League players
Charlton Athletic F.C. players
Exeter City F.C. players
Crawley Town F.C. players
Mansfield Town F.C. players
Burton Albion F.C. players
Poole Town F.C. players
Footballers from Battersea